Angakkuri is a 1979 Indian Malayalam film, directed by Vijayanand and produced by C. V. Hariharan. The film stars Jayan, Jayabharathi, Sukumaran and Seema/Shanthamma. The score was composed by A. T. Ummer. The movie is a remake of the 1979 Kannada movie Sneha Sedu.

Synopsis
The protagonist Ramachandran returns from jail and kills his corrupt boss, who had implicated him in a criminal case that destroyed his family. He abducts the victim's daughter, Sarala, and hands her over to a brothel, where she becomes a prostitute. 

He shifts to a new location, assumes the name Venu, and becomes a criminal. There he befriends taxi-driver Balakrishnan, who is the brother of Sarala and the son of the man Ramachandran murdered. Each man is searching for his enemy, little knowing that it is his best friend. Venu begins a sexual relationship with Krishnan's fiancée Geetha. Thamphi, who is a smuggler, tries to confiscate the land of the poor people, demanding a lakh he knows they cannot pay.

Ramachandhran brings the money and settles him. Thamphi fails to obtain the property and discovers that the money is actually his and had been stolen by Venu, plans revenge. On the day of Geetha and Krishnan's marriage Sarala revels that Venu is Ramachandhran and he is the reason she rents herself. Thamphi arrives and captures Geetha and Sarala. Krishnan and Ramachandhran join hands and win over Thampi, rescue the girls, and hand Thamphi to the police.

It is revealed that Sarala is Ramachandhran's sister who had been kidnapped by Balagandaran; however, he pitied her and looked after her. Ramachandran feels guilty and hits his head with a rock, his blood dripping on Sarala's face. Sarala forgives him. The police do not arrest Ramachandhran, because he had been imprisoned despite his innocence. Ramachandhran marries Geetha and Krishnan marries Sarala.

Cast

Jayan as Ramachandran/Venu
Jayabharathi as Geetha
Sukumaran as Balakrishnan
Seema as Sarala
Sankaradi as Ramachandhran's uncle
Prathapachandran as Balagangadharan, Krishnan's father and Sarala's adoptive father
K. P. Ummer as Thambi
Kunchan as Dasappan
Kuthiravattam Pappu as Kochappan
Mala Aravindan
M. S. Thripunithura
Thodupuzha Radhakrishnan
Kozhikkode Sarada
Joseph E.A
Ceylon Manohar
Punnapra Appachan
Meena as Ammini Amma

Soundtrack
The music was composed by A. T. Ummer, with lyrics were written by Bichu Thirumala.

References

External links
 

1979 films
1970s Malayalam-language films
Malayalam remakes of Kannada films
Films directed by I. V. Sasi
Films scored by A. T. Ummer